In linguistics, an agent noun (in Latin) is a word that is derived from another word denoting an action, and that identifies an entity that does that action. For example, driver is an agent noun formed from the verb drive.

Usually, derived in the above definition has the strict sense attached to it in morphology, that is the derivation takes as an input a lexeme (an abstract unit of morphological analysis) and produces a new lexeme. However, the classification of morphemes into derivational morphemes (see word formation) and inflectional ones is not generally a straightforward theoretical question, and different authors can make different decisions as to the general theoretical principles of the classification as well as to the actual classification of morphemes presented in a grammar of some language (for example, of the agent noun-forming morpheme).

Words related to agent noun

An agentive suffix or agentive prefix is commonly used to form an agent noun from a verb. Examples:
 English: "-er", "-or", "-ist".
 Basque:  ( 'student' from  'learn')
 Greek: , 
 Hungarian: no specific agentive suffix, the nominalization of present participle (suffix: , according to vowel harmony) is used instead; examples:  ('worker'),  ('repairman'),  ('leader', 'driver', 'electrical conductor')
 Maori: 
 Polish: see table
 Quechua:  ( 'to play',  'player')
 Finnish: / ( 'speak',  'speaker';  'hit',  'hitter');  (borrowed from '-or'/'er', probably via German)
 Welsh:  (m.),  (f.)

See also 
 Agent (grammar)
 Nominalization

References

External links

Further reading
 ,  ("Protoslavic Nomen Agentis"), Wrocław, 1975

Nouns by type